The Lakelse Hot Springs, also known as the Mount Layton Hot Springs, are a group of hot springs in the Kalum-Kitimat valley of northern British Columbia, Canada, located  south of Terrace along Highway 37 on the eastern shore of Lakelse Lake. With a maximum temperature of 89 °C, the springs are the hottest in Canada.

The formation of the Lakese Hot Springs is interpreted to be water seeping through hot rocks in faults of the fault-bounded Kalum-Kitimat valley. These faults may also have been the source for the Tseax Cone eruption 250 years ago.

See also
List of hot springs
Volcanism of Canada
Volcanism of Western Canada

References

Hot springs of British Columbia